Stop The Bomb is a non-governmental organization based in Berlin, Germany that seeks to prevent Iran from acquiring nuclear weapons. To advance this goal, the group promotes tougher sanctions on Iran and further economic and diplomatic isolation of the Iranian government. The group has pressured public German and Austrian companies such as Siemens to end their business in Iran by buying shares in these companies and then speaking out company board meetings.

References

External links

Nuclear program of Iran
Germany–Iran relations
Political organisations based in Germany